The Carlos J. Finlay Prize is a biennial scientific prize sponsored by the Government of Cuba and awarded since 1980 by the United Nations Educational, Scientific and Cultural Organization (UNESCO) to people or organizations for their outstanding contributions to microbiology (including immunology, molecular biology, genetics, etc.) and its applications. Winners receive a grant of $5,000 USD donated by the Government of Cuba and an Albert Einstein Silver Medal from UNESCO.

The Prize is awarded in odd years (to coincide with UNESCO's General Conference) and is named after Carlos Juan Finlay (1833 – 1915), a Cuban physician and microbiologist widely known for his pioneering discoveries in the field of yellow fever.

Winners
Source: UNESCO
 1980 - Roger Y. Stanier (Canada)
 1983 - César Milstein, FRS (Argentina, United Kingdom)
 1985 - Victor Nussenzweig and Ruth Nussenzweig (Brazil)
 1987 - Hélio Gelli Pereira (Brazil) and Peter Reichard (Sweden)
 1989 - Georges Cohen (France) and Walter Fiers (Belgium)
 1991 - Margarita Salas and Eladio Viñuela (Spain) and Jean-Marie Ghuysen (Belgium)
 1993 - International Society of Soil Science, James Michael Lynch (UK), James Tiedje (USA), Johannes Antonie Van Veen (Netherlands)
 1995 - Jan Balzarini (Belgium) and Pascale Cossart (France)
 1996 - Etienne Pays (Belgium) and Sheikh Riazzudin (Pakistan)
 1999 - Ádám Kondorosi (Hungary)
 2001 - Susana López Charreton and Carlos Arias Ortiz (Mexico)
 2003 - Antonio Peña Díaz (Mexico)
 2005 - Khatijah Binti Mohamad Yusoff (Malaysia)
 2015 - Yoshihiro Kawaoka (Japan)
 2017 - Samir Kumar Saha (Bangladesh) and Shahida Hasnain (Pakistan)
2020 - Kenya Honda (Japan)

See also
 List of biology awards

References

Biology awards
UNESCO awards
Awards established in 1980